UHF (released internationally as The Vidiot from UHF) is a 1989 American comedy film starring "Weird Al" Yankovic, David Bowe, Fran Drescher, Victoria Jackson, Kevin McCarthy, Michael Richards, Stanley Brock, Gedde Watanabe, Billy Barty, Anthony Geary, Emo Philips and Trinidad Silva; the film is dedicated to Silva, who died shortly after filming wrapped. The film was directed by Jay Levey, Yankovic's manager, who also co-wrote the screenplay with him. The film was originally released by Orion Pictures and is currently owned by Metro-Goldwyn-Mayer. Yankovic and Levey struggled to find a production company to finance the film, but were eventually able to get Orion's support after stating they could keep the film costs under $5 million. Principal photography took place around Tulsa, Oklahoma.

Yankovic stars as George Newman, a shiftless dreamer who stumbles into managing a low-budget television station and, surprisingly, finds success with his eclectic programming choices, spearheaded by the antics of a janitor-turned-children's television host, Stanley Spadowski (Richards). He provokes the ire of a major network station that dislikes the competitive upstart. The title refers to the ultra high frequency (UHF) analog television broadcasting band on which such low-budget television stations were often placed in the United States. Yankovic and Levey wrote the film after Yankovic's second studio album, and chose the approach of George having a vivid imagination to support the inclusion of parodies within the film.

UHF was a financial disappointment, as it was overshadowed by several major Hollywood blockbusters that were released at the same time. The film also received mixed critical reviews, which left Yankovic in a slump that would last until the surprise success of his next album in 1992. Despite being considered a failure, UHF went on to become a cult film thanks to home video and cable TV. The VHS of the film was rare and out of print for many years, with copies going for high prices online. In 2002, the film was released on DVD for the first time, and Shout! Factory released a special 25th-anniversary edition of UHF on November 11, 2014, on DVD and Blu-ray.

Plot

George Newman, a dreamer who bounces between jobs, is put in charge of Channel 62, a UHF television station, when his uncle Harvey wins ownership of it in a poker game. George and his friend Bob realize the station is nearly bankrupt, subsisting on reruns of old shows like The Beverly Hillbillies and Mister Ed. When a package meant for their competitor, VHF station Channel 8, is misdelivered to George at Channel 62, he decides to deliver it himself, only to be rudely thrown out by RJ Fletcher, Channel 8's CEO. Outside, George meets Stanley Spadowski, a janitor who had just been unfairly fired by RJ, and offers him a job at Channel 62.

George and Bob create new programs, including "Uncle Nutzy's Clubhouse", a live children's show hosted by George. The new shows fail to increase viewership and they find themselves days from bankruptcy. While fretting over their finances, George forgets his girlfriend Teri's birthday dinner and she breaks up with him. George laments about his life during the Uncle Nutzy broadcast. He abandons the set, tells Stanley he can host the show, and goes to a bar with Bob to drown their sorrows. At the bar they find the patrons eagerly watching Stanley's slapstick antics on Channel 62. Inspired by Stanley's popularity, George and Bob create a range of bizarre shows to fill the schedule, headlined by the re-titled "Stanley Spadowski's Clubhouse."

RJ, infuriated that Channel 62's ratings now rival those of Channel 8, discovers Harvey owns the station and owes his bookie, Big Louie, $75,000 by the end of the week. RJ offers to pay off Harvey's debt in exchange for the deed to Channel 62. George launches a telethon to sell stock in the station, which would not only save it from RJ but also make it publicly owned. RJ's henchmen stall the telethon by kidnapping Stanley, whom George and several staff-members eventually rescue. RJ again attempts to stall the telethon with a televised public statement, but Channel 62 engineer Philo hijacks it with secretly recorded footage of RJ insulting the town's population.

The telethon ends about $2,000 short of its goal. Harvey concedes victory to RJ who, instead of immediately taking ownership, gloats to the crowd. Meanwhile, a homeless man approaches George, asking to buy the rest of the stock with money obtained by selling a rare coin that RJ, not being aware of its true value, gave him when he was begging for change. George pays off Big Louie, Harvey signs the ownership transfer, and the station officially becomes publicly owned. Because Channel 8 is late in filing its broadcast license renewal and due to the tirade that Philo broadcast, the FCC revokes their license and kicks it off the air. George and the Channel 62 staff and their audience celebrate. George and Teri rekindle their romantic relationship.

Cast

 "Weird Al" Yankovic as George Newman, a daydreaming slacker who becomes the program director of Channel 62 at the behest of his aunt Esther. 
 David Bowe as Bob Steckler/Bobbo the Clown, George's best friend and roommate.
 Fran Drescher as Pamela Finklestein, a secretary at Channel 62 who longs to be an on-air reporter.  
 Michael Richards as Stanley Spadowski, the janitor at Channel 62 who also serves as the host of its highest-rated show.  
 Kevin McCarthy as R.J. Fletcher, the owner of Channel 8 and the film's main antagonist.  
 Victoria Jackson as Teri Campbell, George's long-suffering girlfriend.  
 Stanley Brock as Harvey Bilchik, George's uncle and a serious gambler who wins Channel 62 in a poker game.  
 Sue Ane Langdon as Aunt Esther Bilchik, Harvey's wife and George's aunt.
 Anthony Geary as Philo, Channel 62's station engineer and an alien.  
 Billy Barty as Noodles MacIntosh, one of Channel 62's cameramen.
 Trinidad Silva as Raul Hernandez, host of a Channel 62 show about animals.
 Gedde Watanabe as Kuni, a karate teacher who hosts a game show.
 Vance Colvig Jr. as homeless man
 David Proval as Fletcher's head goon
 John Paragon as R.J. Fletcher Jr.
 Belinda Bauer as Mud Wrestler
 Dr. Demento as himself/Whipped Cream Eater
 Emo Philips as Joe Earley
 Patrick Thomas O'Brien as Satan
 The Kipper Kids as themselves
 John Cadenhead as Crazy Ernie

Production
Yankovic and his manager Jay Levey had discussed the idea of a movie for Yankovic around 1985, after his second major successful album; his popularity at that time led the two to thinking what other venues would work for the musician. The story concept they created was based on Yankovic's approach to his music videos, making parodies of other works. After sketching out a number of such parodies for a film, the concept of Yankovic being the owner of a small-time UHF station broadcasting these parodies as shows was born, as this would not require having any significant plot to string the parodies together, in a manner similar to Airplane! (1980).

The two attempted to shop the script around Hollywood film agencies for about three years without luck. They were surprised when one of their agents had shown the script to the founders of a new production company, Cinecorp, who were interested in the script and had given it to producers Gene Kirkwood and John W. Hyde; Kirkwood stated he had previously seen Yankovic's videos and wanted to make a movie with him. Kirkwood and Hyde had connections with Orion Pictures, who offered to fund the production as long as they could keep it under $5 million.

The title of the film was selected to refer to, at the time of the film's writing, the predominance of local television stations operating on ultra-high-frequency broadcasts in the United States, which were typically known for quirky, low-cost production shows, which the film spoofed. Yankovic suggested the title The Vidiot for the film's international release, but the studio eventually went with The Vidiot from UHF in an effort to connect the international and American versions, with which Yankovic has expressed dissatisfaction.

Locations
Primary filming for UHF occurred in Tulsa; the film's executive producer Gray Frederickson had earlier finished shooting of The Outsiders in Oklahoma, and found the ease and the cost to film in the state to suit the needs of UHF. They found several favorable factors that made the city suitable for filming. At the time of filming, the Kensington Galleria (71st and Lewis) was being closed down to convert the mall into office space, allowing the production team to use it for both sound stage and interior scenes including those for both Channels 8 and 62; the mall was also situated near a hotel making it ideal for housing the cast and crew during filming. The area and close proximity to Dallas allowed them to recruit additional local talent for some of the acts during the telethon scenes.

The Burger World location was Harden's Hamburgers at 6835 East 15th Street in Tulsa, and "Bowling for Burgers" was filmed at Rose Bowl Lanes on East 11th Street. The bar location was Joey's House of the Blues at 2222 East 61st Street. The building used for Kuni's Karate School belongs to Welltown Brewery and is located at 114 West Archer in Tulsa, while "Crazy Ernie's Used Car Emporium" was filmed on the lot of Ernie Miller Pontiac at 4700 South Memorial. The dead fish in the game show "Wheel of Fish" were real, obtained from the White River Fish Market. The news desk was located at OETA, a local PBS member station. The steps of City Hall are actually First Christian Church at 913 S. Boulder, built in 1920. Channel 8's exterior is an office block (6655 South Lewis Building) occupied by Hewlett-Packard. The "U-62" building was constructed around KGTO 1050's AM radio transmitter site (5400 West Edison Street); the real KGTO studios had been moved elsewhere in 1975. Just the tower itself remains at this location today. The airport scenes were taken at Tulsa International Airport.

Casting
Yankovic was always envisioned to be the central character of the film George Newman, written as a straight man with a vivid imagination as to allow the insertion of the parodies into the film's script in a manner similar to the film The Secret Life of Walter Mitty (1947). As the focus of the film was to be on the parodies, George was not fleshed out beyond enough character development to drive the principal storyline. The name "Newman" was selected as homage to Mad magazine's mascot, Alfred E. Neuman, further referenced by the name of "Uncle Nutsy's Clubhouse".

The role of Stanley Spadowski was written by Yankovic with Michael Richards in mind; at the time, Yankovic had been impressed with Richards' stand-up comedy and performance on the show Fridays. Yankovic had also considered that Stanley's role was influenced by Christopher Lloyd's performance on Taxi, and had considered reaching out to Lloyd to offer him the role, but decided to stay with Richards due to their original premise. Richards' agents had told Yankovic that he was not interested in the role as Richards at the time was suffering a bout of Bell's palsy, but when they reached out to Richards again, Richards came to the set, dropping right into the character of Stanley for the test read.

Other principal roles were cast through normal auditions, with most of the choices based on how well the actor fit the role. For George's girlfriend Teri Campbell, they did not feel that they needed to spend a significant amount of time developing this side as they did not consider Yankovic to be the type of actor for a romantic lead. Although Jennifer Tilly and Ellen DeGeneres auditioned, they found Victoria Jackson's soft demeanor to be well-suited for the role.

For R.J. Fletcher, they found that Kevin McCarthy was in a similar stage of his career as Leslie Nielsen, one of many "serious vintage actors who had crossed over into satire", according to Levey, and McCarthy relished the role. In the DVD commentary, Yankovic noted that McCarthy struggled not to laugh during takes. McCarthy himself later described his own character as a fellow who "makes Ebenezer Scrooge look like Sally Struthers". Yankovic also cited one of McCarthy's best-known roles as the ageless history teacher in the classic Twilight Zone episode "Long Live Walter Jameson". Noting McCarthy's gray hair, Yankovic recalled a scene at the end, when Jameson aged rapidly, saying, "For just a split second, he looked just like [he did in the movie]."

Fran Drescher was selected for the role of Pamela Finklestein, both for her established comedy and for her nasally voice that made a humorous contrast for a news anchor.

The producers considered Jerry Seinfeld for the role of George's friend Bob Speck, but he turned it down. David Bowe, who had been a long-time Yankovic fan, easily fit the role during auditions.

Philo's role was written with Joel Hodgson in mind, building on Hodgson's stand-up routines of using homemade inventions and deadpan comedy. Hodgson turned down the role, feeling at the time that he was not a good actor. At the time, Hodgson was also working on Mystery Science Theater 3000. They also approached Crispin Glover for Philo's role, but Glover said that he only wanted to play a used car salesman and no other part, turning down the offer. As they sought other actors, their casting agent Cathy Henderson offered up Anthony Geary, who at the time had gained popularity due to his role on General Hospital. Geary wanted to perform the role both as a fan of Yankovic and seeing the role as completely opposite from his normal acting.

Kuni was written from the start with the intention of being performed by Gedde Watanabe.

Emo Philips was a close friend of Yankovic, and Yankovic felt that he had to include Philips in the movie, eventually creating the role of the clumsy shop teacher for him.

Ginger Baker of the rock band Cream volunteered to audition for the role of the hobo, but Yankovic and the production team found Vance Colvig Jr. to be a better fit.

Levey himself appears in the movie playing Mahatma Gandhi in the spoof segment Gandhi II.

After Trinidad Silva performed his primary scenes, his character was to return for the telethon scenes which had not yet been filmed; however, he died in a car accident.  The filmmakers were too grief-stricken to use body doubles and dropped Silva's appearances in the telethon. The film was dedicated to Silva.

Sylvester Stallone had initially agreed to make a cameo appearance in the film's final act, in the dream sequence in which Yankovic's Newman imagines himself as a John Rambo-type soldier on a mission to rescue Stanley Spadowski (Michael Richards), but ultimately declined to do so.

Reception
UHF received mixed reviews. On review aggregation website Rotten Tomatoes, the film has a 61% rating based on 23 reviews, with an average score of 5.8/10. The site's critical consensus reads, "UHF is bizarre, freewheeling, and spotty, though its anarchic spirit cannot be denied." On Metacritic, which assigns a weighted average based on selected critic reviews, the film has a score of 32 out of 100, based on 11 critics, indicating "generally unfavorable" reviews. Critic Roger Ebert wrote in the Chicago Sun-Times that Yankovic's approach to satire and parody works for the short-form music video, but does not work to fill out a full-length movie. Ebert also called to Yankovic's lack of screen presence, creating a "dispirited vacuum at the center of many scenes"; he gave UHF one star out of four. Chicago Tribune critic Gene Siskel wrote of the film, "Never has a comedy tried so hard and failed so often to be funny"; he gave it a zero star rating. Fellow Tribune critic Dave Kehr said of it "It's not surprising to find that UHF ultimately resolves itself into a series of four-minute, video-style sketches laid pretty much end-to-end, but at least Weird Al has given feature-length fiction the old college try, introducing rudimentary plot and number of semi-functional characters." Michael Wilmington of the Los Angeles Times believed that, as the entire film comprised parodies, it gave no structure for the larger plot to work, thus resulting in "not much of a movie".

According to Yankovic's Behind the Music episode, UHF enjoyed one of the most successful test screenings in Orion's history. Orion Pictures released UHF on July 21, 1989, hoping it would be a summer blockbuster that would revive their commercial fortunes. However, critical response was negative, and it was out of the theaters by the end of the month. The film has been compared to Young Einstein, which similarly scored well with test audiences but failed to make a critical impression. Yankovic has stated that it was not a "critic movie". As Yankovic states in his commentary of the movie, UHF was thought to be the movie that would "save the studio" for Orion. He was treated very well because of this. He states in the commentary: "Every morning I would wake up to fresh strawberries next to my bed. Then, when the movie bombed, I woke up and...no more strawberries!"

Within the month prior, and up to the release of UHF, studios released bigger movies like Indiana Jones and the Last Crusade, Ghostbusters II, Honey, I Shrunk the Kids, Lethal Weapon 2, Batman, Licence to Kill, When Harry Met Sally..., Do the Right Thing and Weekend at Bernie's. The draw of these blockbuster movies also contributed to the low attendance at UHF premiere; The A.V. Club, in a retrospective, called UHF "a sapling among the redwoods" and the type of film that Hollywood has since abandoned. Yankovic and the film's creators considered that the film had a strong audience with younger viewers, which did well to fill midday matinees but did not succeed in helping to sell tickets for more lucrative evening and nighttime showings.

The poor critical response of UHF left Yankovic in a slump that lasted for three years, impacting the finalization of his next studio album. The slump was broken when the band Nirvana rose to wide popularity, inspiring him to write "Smells Like Nirvana" and complete the album Off the Deep End.

Legacy
UHF has since become a cult classic, becoming popular on cable and home video. The movie was released on VHS in Europe, the United States and Canada but, because of the little money earned at the box office, it soon fell out of print. In the several years UHF was out of print, the film developed a cult following, and fans of the film and Yankovic in general pawed desperately for a copy. Prices skyrocketed, ranging from fifty to a hundred dollars or more. Finally, UHF was released on DVD in 2002 by MGM and, in its debut week, it became a top ten bestseller in Variety magazine. The US and Canadian DVD contains numerous extras including a music video of the movie's theme song, a commentary track featuring director Jay Levey and Yankovic himself (with surprise guest appearances by costar Michael Richards and Emo Philips and a phoned-in appearance by Victoria Jackson), and a deleted-scenes reel with Yankovic's commentary. Shout! Factory released a special 25th Anniversary Edition of UHF on November 11, 2014, on DVD and Blu-ray, while Fabulous Films released the movie on Blu-Ray in the United Kingdom on July 27, 2015.

Though Yankovic has considered the possibility of a sequel, he has not actively pursued this. Yankovic noted that UHF is "a product of its era, and comedy has changed so much over the decades", but also considered that the type of comedy predated the nature of Internet phenomena and viral videos. Yankovic further maintained the unlikelihood of a sequel to UHF in an interview, citing the underwhelming box office returns of the film, and lack of industry interest in financing another UHF project.

Gedde Watanabe later reprised his role as Kuni for a guest appearance on The Weird Al Show in 1997.

The music video for Yankovic's "Word Crimes", a song about errant grammar, includes a nod to this movie. When a test paper is shown on the screen, the name George Newman (Weird Al's character from the movie) is displayed on the test. It also features a Reddit account called u/George-Newman.

A webseries called The Real UHF which was heavily inspired by UHF started in 2009.  It starred Dr. Demento, Neil Hamburger and Count Smokula, and it featured guest appearances from Devo, George Clinton, and others. The series was the brainchild of Zack Wolk, an intern for Tim and Eric Awesome Show, Great Job!.

The Cartoon Network series Regular Show references the Twinkie Wiener Sandwich in the season 1 episode "Rigby's Body", where they show a montage of Mordecai and Rigby eating the delicacy in the food stand of the park.

YouTube chef Andrew Rea, also known as Oliver Babish, has attempted to cook "Bob's favorite", the Twinkie Wiener Sandwich, which is a wiener inserted into a top-cut Twinkie, topped with a helping of Easy Cheese.

Soundtrack
Yankovic also released a quasi-soundtrack for the film in late 1989, titled UHF – Original Motion Picture Soundtrack and Other Stuff, which featured songs (and commercials) from the movie as well as his own new, unrelated studio material.

See also

 Pray TV
 Weird: The Al Yankovic Story
 List of films featuring fictional films

References

External links

 
 
 

 
 UHF Filming Locations, 15 Years Later at robohara.com
 Another UHF Tour

1989 films
1989 comedy films
1980s parody films
American independent films
American parody films
American slapstick comedy films
Orion Pictures films
Films about badgers
Films about television
Films directed by Jay Levey
Films scored by John Du Prez
Films shot in Oklahoma
Films set in Oklahoma
Films set in Tulsa, Oklahoma
Films with screenplays by "Weird Al" Yankovic
Films with screenplays by Jay Levey
1989 directorial debut films
Cultural depictions of Mahatma Gandhi
1980s English-language films
1980s American films